Deming Elementary School is an elementary school in Cheyenne, Wyoming. It is part of the Laramie County School District Number 1. The school was  designed by Frederick Hutchinson Porter and built in 1945. It was listed on the National Register of Historic Places in 2005.

According to its NRHP nomination, it was deemed significant for "its direct association with the growth of education in Cheyenne" and "as an example of Art Deco architecture with elements of the International Style in an educational building and as the work of a master architect, Frederick Hutchinson Porter."  The building "is a substantial brick masonry structure built with community pride and permanency in mind, and which incorporates the standard designs advocated by early twentieth century educational reformers."

References

External links

School buildings on the National Register of Historic Places in Wyoming
International style architecture in Wyoming
Art Deco architecture in Wyoming
Buildings and structures completed in 1945
Schools in Laramie County, Wyoming
National Register of Historic Places in Cheyenne, Wyoming
Public elementary schools in Wyoming